Park Ju-ri (born 16 July 1971) is a retired South Korean freestyle swimmer. She competed in three events at the 1988 Summer Olympics.

References

External links
 

1971 births
Living people
South Korean female freestyle swimmers
Olympic swimmers of South Korea
Swimmers at the 1988 Summer Olympics
Place of birth missing (living people)